The Sioux City Masonic Temple in Sioux City, Iowa was built during 1921–1922. It was listed on the National Register of Historic Places in 2004.

It is a two and a half or three story building that cost nearly $300,000 to build, not including nearly $200,000 of custom furnishings.  In 2004 it was deemed significant as "an excellent, unaltered example of the Spanish Colonial Revival architectural design";  it was one of only two downtown commercial buildings in that style, which was popular during 1915 to 1940.  The other is the NRHP-listed Sioux City Free Public Library, two blocks south.  It was designed by Sioux City architects Beuttler and Arnold.

References

Masonic buildings completed in 1922
Buildings and structures in Sioux City, Iowa
Clubhouses on the National Register of Historic Places in Iowa
Masonic buildings in Iowa
National Register of Historic Places in Sioux City, Iowa
1922 establishments in Iowa